Ottó Herman Secondary School is a secondary school in Miskolc, Hungary. The school is famous for being ranked among the best secondary schools in Hungary. In 2018, HVG ranked the school as 12th best in the country outside Budapest, and third best excluding secondary schools located in the capital city of Hungary, Budapest. In 2022, eduline ranked the Herman to be the 30th best high school in Hungary.

History

The school came into being in 1878 when József Samassa, archbishop of the town Eger mandated to start a school with six grades. The location was given by Bükk Zsigmondné Sebe Terézia. Sisters from the church supported the educational initiatives at the beginning.

In 1957, the school was named after Ottó Herman, a Hungarian zoologist, ethnographer, archeologist and politician.

In 1995, a new athletic center was added to the school, adjacent to the main campus, on the other side of the tram line. The two portions of the school are connected with a bridge over the tram line and main road. This addition made the school capable to support more sports.

In 1997, the school celebrated its 40th birthday.

In 2013, a new laboratory facility was added in order to support STEM education.

Gallery

Events and Activities

The school annually organizes student mock government elections where students mock school leadership and run for presidency of the school. In 2019, Dwayne Johnson endorsed a group of students in their race to win the school's annual mock student government elections.

The school is famous for releasing music videos for various occasions (e.g. celebrating holidays and graduating classes) on YouTube that are performed by students.

External links

 Official site

References 

Buildings and structures in Miskolc
Gymnasiums in Hungary
Education in Borsod-Abaúj-Zemplén County